Empire M (translit. Emberatoriet meem) is a 1972 Egyptian drama film directed by Hussein Kamal. The film was entered into the 8th Moscow International Film Festival in 1973. It was also selected as the Egyptian entry for the Best Foreign Language Film at the 46th Academy Awards, but was not accepted as a nominee. The film was remade in a Turkish as Benim Altı Sevgilim in 1977.

Cast
 Faten Hamama as Mother (Mona)
 Ahmed Mazhar
 Dawlad Abiad as Granny
 Seif Abol Naga as Mostafa (as Khaled Abol Naga)
 Hesham Selim as Son
 Hayat Kandeel as Daughter

See also
 List of submissions to the 46th Academy Awards for Best Foreign Language Film
 List of Egyptian submissions for the Academy Award for Best Foreign Language Film

References

External links
 

1972 films
1970s Arabic-language films
1972 drama films
Films directed by Hussein Kamal
Egyptian drama films